José Olguín (2 August 1903 – 16 November 1991) was a Chilean footballer. He competed in the men's tournament at the 1928 Summer Olympics.

References

External links
 
 

1903 births
1991 deaths
Chilean footballers
Chile international footballers
Olympic footballers of Chile
Footballers at the 1928 Summer Olympics
People from Petorca Province
Association football forwards
Colo-Colo footballers